San Diego, I Love You is a 1944 American comedy film directed by Reginald Le Borg and starring Jon Hall, Louise Allbritton and Edward Everett Horton.

The film was a surprise hit at the box office.

Synopsis
Philip McCooley, a widowed high school teacher in small-town California, believes that he has discovered a new self-inflating life raft. He is persuaded by his elder daughter Virginia to travel to San Diego to apply for funds from a developmental agency, and takes his four young sons along as well. On the train journey they encounter and offend John Thompson Caldwell IV by taking his compartment, little realizing that he is extremely wealthy and the head of the agency that the McCooley's need the support of. With their last savings, the family buy a house in the city, which comes with an unusual butler and a very confused lodger.

After Caldwell dismisses McCooley's invention, his daughter forces herself into his company to convince him otherwise. Although at first he resists her approaches, they gradually fall in love as they both come to appreciate the attractions of San Diego. Caldwell is persuaded to give the invention a second look. While McCooley's life raft ultimately proves to be both useless and dangerous, he has unwittingly invented a very destructive explosive which can be used by the War Department.

Buster Keaton appears in an extended cameo role as a bus driver who is persuaded by the heroine to abandon his usual route and drive along the beach.

Cast

 Jon Hall as John Thompson Caldwell IV  
 Louise Allbritton as Virginia McCooley  
 Edward Everett Horton as Philip McCooley  
 Eric Blore as Nelson, the Butler  
 Buster Keaton as Bus Driver  
 Irene Ryan as Sheila Jones  
 Rudy Wissler  as Walter McCooley 
 Peter Miles as Joel McCooley  
 Charles Bates as Larry McCooley 
 Donald Davis as Pete McCooley  
 Florence Lake as Miss Lake  
 Chester Clute as Percy Caldwell  
 Sarah Selby as Mrs. Lovelace  
 Fern Emmett as Mrs. Callope 
 Harry Barris as Clarinetist  
 Leon Belasco as Violinist  
 Hobart Cavanaugh as Mr. McGregor 
 William B. Davidson as General  
 Vernon Dent as Mr. Fitzmaurice 
 Eddie Dunn as Stevedore
 Mabel Forrest as Mrs. Fresher  
 John Gannon as Soldier  
 Edward Gargan as Policeman  
 Victoria Horne as Mrs. Allsop  
 Esther Howard as Mother 
 Teddy Infuhr as Brat  
 Tom Keene as Reporter  
 George Lloyd as Moving Man  
 Matt McHugh as Man on Street  
 George Meader as Mr. Applewaite 
 Clarence Muse as Porter 
 Sarah Padden as Mrs. Gulliver  
 Jack Rice as Hotel Clerk  
 Dewey Robinson as Stevedore  
 Gene Roth as Stevedore  
 Almira Sessions as Mrs. Mainwaring  
 Jerry Shane as Sailor  
 Harry Tyler as Mr. Carruthers  
 Jan Wiley as Receptionist

References

Bibliography
 Robert McLaughlin. We'll Always Have the Movies: American Cinema during World War II. University Press of Kentucky, 2006.

External links
 
Film review at Variety

1944 films
1944 comedy films
American comedy films
Films directed by Reginald Le Borg
Universal Pictures films
Films set in San Diego
Films scored by Hans J. Salter
American black-and-white films
1940s English-language films
1940s American films